The Brussels tram route 23 was a Brussels tram route operated by STIB/MIVB in Brussels, Belgium. It ran between Vanderkindere, which was also the terminus for tram route 24 and where passengers could commute with tram routes 3, 4 and 92, and the Heysel/Heizel metro station, which offers transit with the Brussels metro line 6, tram route 51 and bus routes 84 and 88.
Since March 14, 2011 the newly formed tram 7 follows the same route as tram 23, but with a much higher frequency. Because of the frequency being brought up to 'metro' level, its line number was altered to the lower regions, for those are the metro and so-called 'Chrono' tramlines. Tram 24 was also taken over completely by the newly formed tram 7.

The tram route formed a half-circle from the south of Brussels to its north via the eastern part of the city. It used to start at the Brussels-South railway station, where Eurostar and Thalys trains from the United Kingdom and France arrive, but the route was later shortened to start at Vanderkindere. Tram route 24 followed the same rails as the 23 between Vanderkindere and Princess Elizabeth stops, where tram route 24 deviated to terminate one stop later at the Schaerbeek railway station. Tram route 25 also followed the same rails as routes 23 and 24 for long, between the Buyl and Meiser stops. 

Starting at the Vanderkindere crossroad on the greater ring road in the municipality of Uccle, the tram ran in the middle of this road up to the Bois de la Cambre, that the tram route avoids via Chaussée de Waterloo/Waterloosesteenweg, Avenue Legrand/Legrandlaan and Boulevard de la Cambre/Terkamerenlaan, crossing the municipalities of Ixelles, City of Brussels and Ixelles again. At this point, the tram route followed the greater ring road up to the Gros Tilleul/Dikke Linde, crossing the municipalities of Etterbeek past the Etterbeek railway station, Woluwe-Saint-Pierre at the Montgomery metro station, Woluwe-Saint-Lambert at the Georges Henri premetro station, Schaerbeek up to the Teichman bridge, and the City of Brussels again. Past the Gros Tilleul crossroad, the tram route ran under the Parc de Laeken/Lakenpark up to the Centenaire stop, and then joined the Heysel metro station via another tunnel.

See also
List of Brussels tram routes

External links
 STIB/MIVB

23
City of Brussels
Etterbeek
Ixelles
Schaerbeek
Uccle
Woluwe-Saint-Lambert
Woluwe-Saint-Pierre